Christian August, Prince of Anhalt-Zerbst (29 November 1690, in Dornburg – 16 March 1747, in Zerbst) was a German prince of the House of Ascania, and the father of Catherine the Great of Russia.

He was a ruler of the Principality of Anhalt-Dornburg. From 1742, he was a ruler of the entire Principality of Anhalt-Zerbst. He was also a Prussian Generalfeldmarschall.

Life
Christian August was the third son of John Louis I, Prince of Anhalt-Dornburg and Christine Eleonore of Zeutsch (1666–1699). After the death of his father in 1704, Christian August inherited Anhalt-Dornburg jointly with his brothers John Louis II, John Augustus (died 1709), Christian Louis (died 1710) and John Frederick (died 1742).

After possibly six months as a captain in the regiment guard in 1708, on 11 February 1709 he joined the Regiment on foot in Anhalt-Zerbst (No. 8) which later changed its name to the Grenadier's Regiment King Frederick William IV of Prussia. It was stationed in Stettin. In 1711, Christian August was awarded the Order De la Générosité, later renamed in Pour le Mérite, and on 1 March 1713 was elevated to the rank of lieutenant-colonel. After he took part in several military campaigns during the Spanish War of Succession and in the Netherlands, in 1714 Christian August was appointed Chief of the Regiment; two years later, on 4 January 1716 he was named colonel and on 14 August 1721 became major-general.

On 22 January 1729 he became commander of Stettin, after having been chosen there on 24 May 1725 as a knight of Order of the Black Eagle. Christian August was designated on 28 May 1732 lieutenant-general and on 8 April 1741 infantry general. On 5 June of that year he was designated Governor of Stettin. On 16 May 1742 King Frederick II of Prussia awarded him the highest military dignity, the rank of Generalfeldmarschall.

Six months later, the death of his cousin John Augustus, Prince of Anhalt-Zerbst, without any issue made him and his older and only surviving brother, John Louis II, the heirs of Anhalt-Zerbst as co-rulers. Christian August remained in Stettin and his brother took full charge of the government, but he died only four years later, unmarried and childless. For this reason, Christian August had to leave Stettin and return to Zerbst, but he only reigned four months until his own death.

Marriage and issue
On 8 November 1727 in Vechelde, Christian August married Johanna Elisabeth of Holstein-Gottorp (24 October 1712 – 30 May 1760), daughter of Prince Christian August of Schleswig-Holstein-Gottorp, Prince of Eutin and sister of King Adolf Frederick of Sweden. They had five children:
Sophie Auguste Fredericka (2 May 1729 – 17 November 1796), who later became Catherine II the Great, Empress of Russia.
William Christian Frederick (17 November 1730 – 27 August 1742).
Frederick Augustus (8 August 1734 – 3 March 1793).
Auguste Christine Charlotte (10 November 1736 – 24 November 1736).
Elisabeth Ulrike (17 December 1742 – 5 March 1745).

Ancestors

References

 Ferdinand Siebigk: Christian August (Fürst von Anhalt-Zerbst). In: Allgemeine Deutsche Biographie (ADB). Band 4, Duncker & Humblot, Leipzig 1876, S. 157–159.

1690 births
1747 deaths
People from Gommern
Field marshals of Prussia
Christian
Christian
Christian
Catherine the Great
Royal reburials
Military personnel from Saxony-Anhalt